The style sapin, or pine tree style, is a variation of Art Nouveau created in La Chaux-de-Fonds, Switzerland, by the Swiss artist Charles L'Eplattenier (1874–1946), a professor of the school of art and design in that town.  The basic principle taught by L'Eplattenier was that art should be inspired by nature, in this case by the pine trees that covered the Jura Mountains around the town.

L'Eplattenier began teaching the higher course of art and decoration at the regional School of Art in 1905, where his students included the Charles-Edouard Jeanneret, the future Le Corbusier.  He declared that "nature is the sole inspiration" and urged his students to study the regional plants, flowers and wildlife.  In his official report to the school administration,  he wrote, "the base of our studies or ornament remains always the pine tree. This tree, at its different ages, studied in its different ages, in its totality, or in detail, offers an inexhaustible resource of decoration... The great silver chardon, the gentienes, as well as our Jurassian wildlife, add a considerable richness."

The most famous production of the school was a chalet, the Villa Fallet, designed in 1906 by the eighteen-year old Jeanerette, which included a frieze with a pine tree motif over the front door.  The students produced a variety of other decorative objects. A collection of one hundred eight decorative works designed by the students was presented at an international exposition in Milan in 1906, which earned the school an honorable mention.  The artist Henriette Grandjean, a student in the upper course, also made numerous objects in the style sapin, which are now in the Musée d'Orsay in Paris.

The crematorium
The crematorium of La Chaux-de-Fonds (1909–1910) is the most comprehensive example of the style. It was designed by Charles L'Eplattenier, using the triangular motif of the pine tree and pine cone emblems in the facade sculpture and interior decor.  The symbolist murals by L'Eplatttenier were added later.  The crematorium facade and interior is decorated with stylized pine cone sculpture, and the ceiling has a highly stylized pine tree and flame motif.

Notes and citations

Art Nouveau
Architecture in Switzerland
Decorative arts
Art movements in Europe
Art Nouveau architecture